The Taipei Metro Guandu station (formerly transliterated as Kuantu Station until 2003) is located in Beitou District, Taipei, Taiwan. It is a station on the Tamsui Line. In the past, the station belonged to the now-defunct TRA Tamsui Line.

Station overview

The at-grade, station structure with two side platforms and two exits. The washrooms are inside the entrance area. The station is situated southwest of Guandu Elementary School, between Zhongyang North Road, Dadu Road and Ligong Street.

History
After the war it was renamed to Kuantu. On 15 July 1988, this service was discontinued and station was closed, and was re-opened on 28 March 1997.

The five millionth EasyCard was sold at Guandu station on 7 February 2005.

Station layout

First and Last Train Timing 
The first and last train timing at Guandu station  is as follows:

Around the station 
 Guandu Nature Park
 Guandu Temple
 Tittot Glass Art Museum

References

1901 establishments in Taiwan
Tamsui–Xinyi line stations
Railway stations opened in 1901
Railway stations closed in 1988
Railway stations opened in 1997